The 2002 World Cup was the 17th edition of the FIFA international association football tournament.

2002 World Cup may also refer to:

Alpine skiing – 2002 Alpine Skiing World Cup
Athletics (track and field) – 2002 IAAF World Cup
Field Hockey:
 2002 Men's World Hockey Cup
 2002 Women's World Hockey Cup
Rugby Union – 2002 Women's Rugby World Cup